Kaniyapuram is a residential and IT industrial area of Thiruvananthapuram metropolitan area of Trivandrum city around  from Thiruvananthapuram, Kerala, India. The main centre of Kaniyapuram area is located in NH-66 in between Kazhakkoottam and Pallippuram CRPF Base. The Kaniyapuram locality (Kaniyapuram pradesam) is a vast area and expands to; Andoorkonam in the East, Parvathy Puthanar in the West, Vetturoad in the South and Pallippuram (CRPF Base) in the North. The Kaniyapuram town belongs to the Andoorkonam Panchayat, although Andoorkonam still remains a village  to the east.The main town in Kaniyapuram is Alummoodu junction.

Economy
Kaniyapuram is one of the fastest developing town in Trivandrum district. The upcoming Technocity on the left side and technopark on the right both of which are  2 km from the town. The National Highway (NH66) passes through Kaniyapuram junction dividing the town into two. The main features of Kaniyapuram are the Bus Stand in the National Highway and Railway Station, which are situated very close to each other. There is no other place in between Trivandrum and Quilon towns with this feature. The KSRTC (Kerala State Road Transport Corporation) bus depot has about 40 buses, originating and terminating from/in Kaniyapuram. This is the only depot which has no fare stage for Fast passenger and Super fast buses. Unfortunately, only a few trains stop at the Kaniyapuram Railway station though efforts are being undertaken to establish stops for some express trains.
Proximity to government establishments, business places, educational institutions such as Technopark, Power Grid, CRPF Base, KINFRA Park, LNCPE, University Campus, Marian Engineering College, St. Xavier's College, Teacher's Education College and numerous schools etc. has also put Kaniyapuram on the state maps.  At present Kaniyapuram area is one of the most developing areas around Trivandrum city.

History
The name "Kaniyapuram" is believed to have derived from the word "Kaniyan Puram - the domain of Kaniyans /Ganak- astrologists" or " Kaniyar Puram - the place of Kaniyars - the proponents of Kaniyar Kali , a temple art form" or "Ganika Puram (the place of Ganikas - the courtesans").

The Lebbas are amongst the very prominent clan of Kaniyapuram.  According to documented history, the Lebbas migrated from Tamil Nadu in the early 1650s to Kerala.  It is believed that they established in Kaniyapuram as early as the 1650s and established themselves as traders in Kaniyapuram.  They were successful merchants and operated almost all the business in Kaniyapuram until recent times.

The Lebbas' main contribution to the Kaniyapuram society is the establishment of The Muslim High School, Kaniyapuram.  The school was founded by late S Ahmed Kunju Lebba in 1947.  The school had played a major role in the educational and social development of the area.  Students from far away places such as Chirayinkil, Perumathura, Kazhakkoottam, Pothencode etc.

It is stated in "Insight" the Bimonthly Journal of Ambedkar Study Circle, Jawaharlal Nehru University (JNU), Delhi, that during the early 1900s Dalit Movement, "Walk to Freedom" led by the famous Dalit reformist, Ayyankali, the youngsters got out on the Kaniyapuram streets to win their basic rights; and the Kaniyapuram Dalit farmers did participate in an agrarian strike by not showing up in the paddy fields (1907).

Being surrounded by coconut groves and backwaters, coir and associated industries were aplenty in the yesteryears and considered as the main occupation of Kaniyapuram residents.  However, this industry is currently on doldrums and struggling for survival.

Until three decades, water transport was the main mean of goods transportation from Kaniyapuram.  Coconuts and coir products were transported to Kollam and Alappuzha from Kaniyapuram, through Parvathi Puthannaar and Kadinam Lake in large covered wooden boats (kettuvallam) and were loaded from the jetties located at Kadavil, Anakkapilla and Channankara.

The water transportation through Parvathi Puthannaar which played a crucial role in the lives of many traders in Kaniyapuram came into disuse after the advent of railways and the National Highways.  In 2002 the state Government undertook a dredging and widening project to revitalise the canal to attract tourists.

Accessibility 
 Kaniyapuram is 14 km towards north from Trivandrum city.
 Trivandrum International Airport, KSRTC Bus Depot Trivandrum and Trivandrum Central Railway Station are just around 14 km from Kaniyapuram with easy road and railroad connections.
 National Highway 66 is crisscrossed by a number of rural roads.
 From Vetturoad  one road towards east lead to Saink School-Kattayikkonam-Chanthavila, connecting to Pothencode and MC Road..
 Another road from Vetturoad toward west connects to Chittattumukku-St.Andrews-Puthenthopu-Menamkulam-Station Kadavu etc.
 One road from Kaniyapuram centre towards west connects to Murukkumpuzha-Chirayinkil, Masthan jn., pallinada, jawacottage, Channankara-Perumathura, Padinjattumukku-Puthenthope etc.
 Another road from Pallippuram towards east lead to Andoorkonam, Pothencode etc.
 Several panchayath roads connect every nook-and-corner of Kaniyapuram locality.

Notable People 
 Alikunju Shastri - Freedom Fighter and Former MLA, Kerala Legislative Assembly, 1960.
 AD.M.A VAHID - EX MLA KERALA LEGISLATIVE ASSEMBLY 2001 TO2016

Schools 
 Govt Upper Primary School, Kaniyapuram.
 Govt Lower Primary School, Kaniyapuram.
 Muslim High School For Boys, Kaniyapuram.
 Muslim High School For Girls, Kaniyapuram.
 Muslim Girls Higher Secondary School, Kaniyapuram.
 Angel Kids Central School, Kaniyapuram
 Bright Central School, Lebba Nagar, Near Railway Station Kaniyapuram.
 Kairali Vidya Mandir, Kaniyapuram.
 VINCENT HIGH SCHOOL KANIYAPURAM
 IRSHADIYA WOMENCE COLLEGE KANIYAPURAM

Colleges / Institutions 
 St. Xaviers College, Thumba.
 Marian Engineering College, Menamkulam.
 Kerala University College of Teachers Education, Govt UPS Campus, Kaniyapuram.
 St. Jacob's Training College, Menamkulam.
 Theera Jyothi Teachers Training Institute, St. Vincent HS Campus, Padinjattumukku.
 MGM COLLEGE OF ARTS AND & SCENCE ,KANIYAPURAM

Hospitals 
 Kaniyapuram Hospital, Kaniyapuram.
 AR Hospital, Kaniyapuram.
 Shifa Medical Centre, Kaniyapuram.

Madrassas
 Hayathul Islam Madrasa, Vayalilkada, Kaniyapuram.
 Samastha Kerala Women Shariath College, Masthanmukku, Kaniyapuram. 
 Quadisiyya Hifzul Qur-an College, Malamelparamb, Kaniyapurm.
 Al Rashid Yatheem Khana (Orphanage), Pallippuram. 
 Nibras-ul Islam Madrasa, Palli Nada, Kaniyapuram.
 Vadiul Uloom Arabic College, Vadayilmukku, Kaniyapuram.

Libraries 
 Noorul Islam Grandasala, Kaniyapuram.
 YMHA Library, Padinjattumukku, Kaniyapuram.
 Republic Library, Andoorkonam.

Play grounds 
 M.H.S.Ground
 Y.M.H.A

Attractions 
 Kadinamkulam lake
 Kandal sree bhagavathi temple
 Puthenthope Beach
 Puthenthope  church
 Karichara Kadavu
 VADAYILMUKKU KADAVU
 Perumathura Muthala Pozhi
 Konath Durgabhagavathi Temple\
 KAKATURUTTU KARICHARA

Associations 
 KANIYAPURAM ,PALLINADA RESIDENTS ASSOCIATION (KPR)
 KANDAL NORTH RESIDENTS ASSOCIATION (KNRA).
Kaniyapuram Alummoodu Town Residents Association (KATRA).
 Kaniyapuram Railview Residents Association (KRRA).
 Pallippuram Residents Association (PRA).
 Karichara Residents Association.
 Gandhi Nagar Residents Association.
 Main Business House
 Steel & Cement Dealers

See also
Karicharakadavu

References 

Cities and towns in Thiruvananthapuram district
Suburbs of Thiruvananthapuram